Geir Tore Myhre (7 April 1954 – 22 July 2016) was a Norwegian ice hockey player and coach. He played for the Norwegian national ice hockey team, and participated in the Winter Olympics in 1980 and 1984. Myrhe scored two goals in his Olympic ice hockey career, both against the United States: he gave Norway a 1-0 lead against the Americans in the first period of their 1980 match-up, only to watch Team USA come back to win 5-1 en route to the gold medal. Four years later, Myrhe scored in a 3-3 tie versus the USA.

Myrhe played for three Norwegian champion clubs, in 1976, 1982 and 1984, and was awarded Gullpucken as best Norwegian ice hockey player in 1980 and 1982. After retiring as a player, he coached the Norwegian national team from 1994 to 1996.

References

External links

1954 births
2016 deaths
Hasle-Løren IL players
Ice hockey players at the 1980 Winter Olympics
Ice hockey players at the 1984 Winter Olympics
Lillehammer IK coaches
Norway men's national ice hockey team coaches
Norwegian ice hockey coaches
Norwegian ice hockey right wingers
Olympic ice hockey players of Norway
Sparta Warriors players
Ice hockey people from Oslo
Trondheim Black Panthers players
Vålerenga Ishockey coaches
Vålerenga Ishockey players